Charlottenhof may refer to:

Charlottenhof Palace, palace in Sanssouci Park, Potsdam, Germany
Aegviidu, settlement in Estonia with old German name Charlottenhof
Giślinek, settlement in Poland with old German name Charlottenhof